

X

References

  - includes IATA codes
 
 Aviation Safety Network - IATA and ICAO airport codes
 Great Circle Mapper - IATA, ICAO and FAA airport codes

X